Tomáš Vestenický (born 6 April 1996) is a Slovak footballer who plays as a forward for Slovak team FC ViOn Zlaté Moravce.

Club career

FC Nitra
He made his professional debut for FC Nitra against FC Spartak Trnava on 13 September 2013.

Loan to Roma
On 29 January 2014 he signed one-and-half year loan with option to buy with Italian Roma.

Cracovia
On 19 February 2016 he was loaned for a half year to Polish side Cracovia. After the loan ended, he signed a permanent contract with the club. In early 2021, he was moved by Cracovia to their second squad that plays in the III liga.

Chayka Peschanokopskoye
On 13 May 2021, he signed a two-year contract with Russian Football National League club FC Chayka Peschanokopskoye that was expected to begin on 1 July 2021. On 2 July 2021, Russian Football Union decided to relegate Chayka from second-tier FNL back to the third-tier PFL for the 2021–22 season for fixing games in the 2018–19 season. As foreign players are not allowed to play in the PFL, that meant a release from his contract with Chayka.

External links

FC Nitra profile

Eurofotbal profile

References

External links
 

1996 births
Living people
Sportspeople from Topoľčany
Slovak footballers
Slovakia youth international footballers
Slovakia under-21 international footballers
Slovak expatriate footballers
Association football forwards
FC Nitra players
A.S. Roma players
Modena F.C. players
MKS Cracovia (football) players
FC Chayka Peschanokopskoye players
FC Dinamo București players
FK Riteriai players
FC ViOn Zlaté Moravce players
Slovak Super Liga players
Serie B players
Ekstraklasa players
Liga I players
A Lyga players
Expatriate footballers in Italy
Slovak expatriate sportspeople in Italy
Expatriate footballers in Poland
Slovak expatriate sportspeople in Poland
Expatriate footballers in Russia
Slovak expatriate sportspeople in Russia
Expatriate footballers in Romania
Slovak expatriate sportspeople in Romania
Expatriate footballers in Lithuania
Slovak expatriate sportspeople in Lithuania